Anthony Charles Telford (born March 6, 1966) is a retired professional baseball pitcher who currently works for the Pittsburgh Pirates of Major League Baseball (MLB).  As a player, the Baltimore Orioles selected him in the third round of the 1987 MLB draft from San Jose State, where he was named an All-American.  He spent nine total seasons pitching mainly in relief for the Orioles, Montreal Expos, and Texas Rangers.

Professional career

Playing career
The Orioles selected Telford in the third round of the 1987 Major League Baseball Draft from San Jose State, where he had been named an All-American. (He also played collegiate summer baseball with the Anchorage Bucs in 1986 and 1987.) In his major league debut on August 19, 1990, he was credited as the winning pitcher in the Orioles' 3–2 victory over the Oakland Athletics.  In seven innings as the game's starting pitcher, Telford allowed just one hit with no earned runs.

Telford spent the bulk of his career as a middle relief pitcher with the Montreal Expos from 1997 to 2001.

He played his last game in the majors with the Texas Rangers in 2002.

Post-playing career 
In 2007, Telford was the pitching coach for the Aiken Foxhounds in the independent South Coast League. In January 2010, the Pittsburgh Pirates hired Telford into their newly created position of Personal Development Coordinator. In 2013 and 2014, Telford played in charity baseball games with other retired players.

Personal life
A graduate of San José State University and Silver Creek High School in San Jose, California, Telford resides in Odessa, Florida.  He is a devout Christian and is married with three children.

References

External links

 Anthony Charles Telford biography provided by the Baseball Almanac
 Anthony Charles Telford profile provided by the Baseball Cube

1966 births
Living people
Aiken Foxhounds players
All-American college baseball players
American expatriate baseball players in Canada
Baltimore Orioles players
Baseball players from San Jose, California
Buffalo Bisons (minor league) players
Canton-Akron Indians players
Edmonton Trappers players
Hagerstown Suns players
Major League Baseball pitchers
Montreal Expos players
People from Odessa, Florida
Texas Rangers players
San Jose State Spartans baseball players
Frederick Keys players
Jupiter Hammerheads players
Newark Orioles players
Oklahoma RedHawks players
Ottawa Lynx players
Richmond Braves players
Rochester Red Wings players
Anchorage Bucs players